Mezen Airport  is an airport in Arkhangelsk Oblast, Russia located 4 km north of Mezen. It handles small transport planes. There are several weekly flights to Arkhangelsk and several flights per month to the remote locations of Mezensky District — the selos of Koyda, Moseyevo, and Safonovo.

In 1883, a weather station was open in Mezen. It was operating under the authority by the Russian Geographical Society but run by single individuals. In 1939 the observations suitable for aviation started, and from 1942, the weather station was used to support the flights.

References

Airports built in the Soviet Union
Airports in Arkhangelsk Oblast